Yeclano Deportivo is a Spanish football team based in Yecla, in the autonomous community of Murcia. Founded in 2004 it currently plays in Segunda División B, holding home games at Estadio de La Constitución, which has a capacity of 4,000 spectators.

History
Yeclano Deportivo was founded in 2004, after the disappearance of historical Yeclano Club de Fútbol. Pedro Romero with other local supporters became the founders of the new club from Yeclano. It first competed in the fourth division in 2006–07, being relocated to Group 13 in 2008. In the 2008-09 season the club was in the leading group, finally finished in the 4th position, just 7 points away from the champion. 

In the 2009–10 season Yeclano finished in second position in its group, promoting to the third level for the first time in its history after disposing of CF Trival Valderas (5–3 on aggregate), UD Pájara Playas de Jandía (2–1) and Haro Deportivo (1–1, penalty shootout win) in the playoffs. The next season was difficult, as the club couldn't remain its place in the Segunda División B. 

In the 2018–19 season the club won Tercera División, Group 13 and promoted to Segunda División B.

Season to season

3 seasons in Segunda División B
11 seasons in Tercera División

Honours
Tercera División: 2011–12, 2017–18

Current squad

Famous players
 Javi Moreno

References

External links
Official website 
Futbolme team profile 
Unofficial website 
Club & stadium history 

Football clubs in the Region of Murcia
Association football clubs established in 2004
2004 establishments in Spain